This is a list of colonial governors of the South Carolina from 1670 to 1775. Until the beginning of the American Revolution in 1775, South Carolina was a colony of Great Britain. South Carolina was named in honor of King Charles I of England, who first formed the English colony, with Carolus being Latin for "Charles".

Proprietary period (1670–1719)

Governors of the Proprietary Period were appointed either by the Proprietors or the Grand Council convening in Charles Town. In 1663, Charles II granted the land to eight Lords Proprietors in return for their financial and political assistance in restoring him to the throne in 1660.

Royal period (1719–1776)

Governors of the Royal Period were appointed by the monarch in name but were selected by the British government under the control of the Board of Trade. Governors served as a viceroy to the British monarch. The governor could appoint provincial officials or suspend their offices on his own authority, except those offices named above that were also appointed by the crown. Legislative bills required royal assent from the governor and could be rejected; he could prorogue or dissolve the Commons House of Assembly on his own authority.

References

See also
List of governors of South Carolina
List of colonial governors of North Carolina
Province of Carolina
Province of South Carolina

Lists of American colonial governors
Colonial United States (British)